Manor House is a Category B listed manor house in the Scottish village of Inveresk, East Lothian.  It dates to 1748, and it received its historic designation in 1971. The house was built for Archibald Shiells.

See also
List of listed buildings in Inveresk, East Lothian

References

Category B listed buildings in East Lothian
Manor houses in Scotland
1748 establishments in Scotland